Huqiu may refer to the following locations in China:

Suzhou
Tiger Hill, Suzhou, or "Huqiu Hill"
Huqiu District (虎丘区), named after the hill
Tiger Hill Pagoda, or "Huqiu Pagoda" (虎丘塔), pagoda on Tiger Hill
Yunyan Temple (Suzhou), a temple on Tiger Hill, also known as "Huqiu Temple" (虎丘寺)

Fujian
Huqiu, Anxi County (虎邱镇), town in Anxi County, Fujian